An inclusive business is a self-sustainable business entity that productively integrates low-income populations into its value chain. By prioritizing value creation over value capture and adopting principles of non-discrimination, inclusive businesses create new economic opportunities for low-income populations but do not necessarily pursue profit maximization objectives. By means of an inclusive business model, inclusive businesses engage, support and create demonstrable value for low income producers, suppliers, retailers and/or service providers and actively avoid destroying value 'along the path to value creation'.   

By emphasizing productive integration, inclusive businesses are distinguishable from social businesses developing goods and services specifically for low income populations.

See also
 Inclusive growth
 Social entrepreneurship
 Triple bottom line
 Bottom of the pyramid

References

Economic development
Human resource management
International environmental organizations
Sustainable business